Tyco Toys was an American toy manufacturer. It was acquired by Mattel in 1997.

History

Founding
Mantua Metal Products was a Woodbury Heights, New Jersey, metalworks business founded in 1926 by John Tyler and family. In the 1930s Mantua began to manufacture HO scale model trains of die-cast metal and became a leading hobbyist brand.

Wartime business
From 1942 to 1945, the production of model railroad products was suspended as the company participated in the manufacturing of precision measuring and mapping equipment for the U.S. Army and Navy in World War II. The company received the Army-Navy ‘E’ Award for excellence in production in 1945. After the war, they converted the plant back to the production of model railroading equipment.

Advent of the TYCO brand
Launching in 1957, Mantua pioneered HO-scale model railroad “ready-to-run” die-cast locomotives. These products, also available as assembly kits, were sold under the TYCO (for Tyler Company) name. Many TYCO and Mantua die-cast products, such as steam engines, are collector's items today.

1960s to 1980s
In the 1960s, TYCO changed its focus from train kits to ready-to-run trains sold in hobby shops and added HO-scale electric racing sets, or "slot car" sets. A wide range of slot cars and repair parts, track sections, controllers and accessories were also available. The slot car rage started in 1963. By the 1970s, TYCO shifted sales and marketing to a consumer-oriented, mass marketing focus. Eventually, the name changed to TYCO Industries, under which name the company was sold in 1970 to Consolidated Foods during an era of corporate conglomerates.  At this time, Tyco was headquartered at Moorestown NJ, where sets were assembled with imported models.  As a division of what became the Sara Lee Corporation, Tyco continued to grow. By the mid-1980s, Tyco dominated the market in electric racing, also producing "slot trucks" known as US-1 Trucks, as well as radio-controlled vehicles.

Expansion
In the late 1980s and early 90s, Tyco expanded and diversified by acquiring several popular toy companies. In 1989, the company purchased the View-Master/Ideal Group, which brought to the company the View-Master, Magna Doodle and the Ideal Nursery line of dolls. In 1992, Tyco purchased the Illco Toy Company, bringing Illco's extensive line of toys based on the children's show Sesame Street to Tyco. In the mid-1990s, as a bigger toy company, company headquarters was moved to Mt.Laurel Twp NJ, near Exit-40 of I-295.  It purchased Matchbox, a maker of model cars, in 1993.

In 1984 Tyco produced its own interlocking brick product, "Super Blocks". Super Blocks were compatible with LEGO, and were made following the basic LEGO patent's expiry in 1978. LEGO attempted to halt the production of Super Blocks in a lawsuit, which was later won by Tyco in 1987.

Tyco's musical toys of the late 1980s and early 1990s included the Tyco Hot Lixx and Tyco Hot Keyz, an electronic guitar and keytar respectively.

Across the late 1980s and early 1990s, some of Tyco's most popular toys came from their Radio Control division, with over 100 different models manufactured primarily through their partnership with Taiyo RC (Japan). In the 1992 Tyco Catalogue used in industry toy fairs to sell and promote products to major retail buyers, the first 20 pages was consumed by their lineup of radio control toys for the year. These products and their manufacturing deal with Taiyo became so important that they took a significant ownership stake in the company, and began to strongly influence the features and design of the vehicles. This resulted in all Taiyo models, both those sold under the Taiyo brand in Japan and worldwide, and those sold by Tyco changing from predominantly realistic models of actual vehicles (such as the 1988 Lamborghini Countach and 1989 Porsche 962) to less realistic products such as the 1994 Tyco Triple Wheels, 1993 Tyco Python, and 1997 Tyco Tantrum.  

In the 1990s, the company also branched out with other toys such as airplanes. It made a hit in 1991 with their Disney's Little Mermaid dolls that were released in conjunction with the movie.

Tyco's Sesame Street line increased dramatically in popularity in 1996, when the plush doll Tickle Me Elmo became the most sought-after toy of the Christmas season.

Defunct
When Tyco was purchased by Mattel on March 27, 1997, it was the third-largest toy company in the United States. The brand survived into the 2000s and beyond as the Mattel Tyco R/C division, while much of the Sesame Street line, Magna Doodle, and the View-Master were transferred to the Fisher-Price division. On February 23, 2019, Terry Flynn announced that Tyco was now a registered trademark of his Harden Creek Slot Cars, LLC.

Legacy
The Tyco model railroad business was bought back by the Tyler family in 1977, who revived them under the Mantua Industries brand. Tyco left the model railroad business after the 1993 catalog. Many of the Tyco model train products were subsequently manufactured by Mantua and by International Hobby Corporation (IHC). In 2001, Mantua stopped producing its model railroad lines and sold the business to the Model Power company, which continued to sell a few items such as steam engines and freight cars under its Mantua Classics brand. In early 2014, Model Power was acquired by Model Rectifier Corporation (MRC). The company continued to make the Mantua Classics line. (The locomotives are also available with DCC and sound.) In 2018, MRC sold its line of HO model trains to Lionel Corporation who slowly reintroduced the line under their own name.

See also 

 Interlego AG v Tyco Industries Inc

External links 

 https://tycocollectors.com - an effort by vintage toy collectors to document all known Tyco R/C models and their specifications based on photographic evidence.

References 

Mattel subsidiaries
Model manufacturers of the United States
Model railroad manufacturers
Radio-controlled car manufacturers
Slot car manufacturers
Defunct manufacturing companies based in New Jersey
Companies based in Gloucester County, New Jersey
American companies established in 1926
Toy companies established in 1926
Manufacturing companies disestablished in 1998
1926 establishments in New Jersey
1997 disestablishments in New Jersey
1997 mergers and acquisitions